Ted Scanlan (7 December 1847 – 9 January 1916) was an Australian cricketer. He played one first-class match for New South Wales in 1877/78.

See also
 List of New South Wales representative cricketers

References

External links
 

1847 births
1916 deaths
Australian cricketers
New South Wales cricketers
Cricketers from Sunderland